All competitive handball in Scotland is sanctioned and organised by the Scottish Handball Association.

The Scottish Handball Men's League Season ran from 3 October 2009 until 22 May 2010.

Gracemount Handball Club were crowned the Men's League Champions on 10 April 2010 after clinching a 32-32 draw against Glasgow Handball Club.

All league games and cup qualification matches were played at Blackburn Community Centre, Blackburn, West Lothian.

The Scottish Cup Finals were played at the Paisley Lagoon Leisure Centre.

Scottish Men's League

Fixtures/results

Week 1–3 October 2009

 Free Week - Tryst 77 HC

Week 2–17 October 2009

 Free Week - Cumbernauld HC

Week 3–7 November 2009

 Free Week - Glasgow HC

Week 4–21 November 2009

 Free Week - Gracemount HC

Week 5–5 December 2009

 Free Week - Ayr HC

Week 6–12 December 2009

 Free Week - EK82 HC

Week 7–9 January 2010

 Free Week - Liberton HC

Week 8–23 January 2010

 Free Week - Tryst 77 HC

Week 9–6 February 2010

 Free Week - Cumbernauld HC

Week 10–27 February 2010

 Free Week - Glasgow HC

Week 11–6 March 2010

 Free Week - Gracemount HC

Week 12–27 March 2010

 Free Week - Ayr HC

Week 13–10 April 2010

 Free Week - EK82 HC

Week 14–17 April 2010

Free Week - Liberton HC

League table 2009/10

League statistics

The following statistics for the Scottish Handball League are up to and including week 14:

Top goalscorers

Club disciplinary records

Scottish Cup season 2009/10

Quarter final

Blackburn Community Centre, West Lothian
24 April 2010

Semi final

Blackburn Community Centre, West Lothian
8 May 2010

Final

Paisley Lagoon Leisure Centre, Paisley
22 May 2010

Top goalscorers

References

External links
 Official site

Handball competitions in Scotland
Hand
Hand